Nothomyia flavipes is a species of soldier fly in the family Stratiomyidae.

Distribution
Jamaica.

References

Stratiomyidae
Insects described in 1977
Diptera of North America
Endemic fauna of Jamaica